Tieffenbrucker is a large multigenerational family of luthiers, originally from Bavaria, active in Venice and Padua, Italy from the beginning of the 16th century till around 1630. Several of their 16th- and 17th-century lutes are on display at the Lobkowicz Palace in Prague.

See also
 Gasparo Duiffopruggar

References
Lundberg, Robert (2002). "Historical Lute Construction" 
 "THE TIEFFENBRUCKER FAMILY and its collaborators" pp. 262 - 343, book "Viol and Lute Makers of Venice 1490 -1630" by Stefano Pio, Venice 2012, Ed. Venice research. www.veniceresearch.com

Italian luthiers
German luthiers
Families of German ancestry
Italian families